The Springfield Cardinals are a Minor League Baseball team based in Springfield, Missouri. They compete as a member of the Texas League's North Division. The Cardinals began play in 2005.

The team is owned by the 11-time Major League Baseball (MLB) World Champion St. Louis Cardinals, for which it has been the Double-A affiliate since its founding in 2005. Since its inception, the team's home venue has been Hammons Field.

The Springfield Cardinals won three Texas League North 1st Half Division titles, two Texas League North 2nd Half Division titles, two Texas League North championships and one Texas League championship (2012). Through the 2020 season, a total of 114 former Springfield Cardinals have gone on to make their Major League debut with St. Louis with an additional 27 others debuting with different MLB teams.

Previously, the St. Louis Cardinals' Double-A affiliate was the Tennessee Smokies, located near Sevierville, Tennessee. The Springfield Cardinals' Texas League North rivals are the Arkansas Travelers (Seattle Mariners), Northwest Arkansas Naturals (Kansas City Royals), Tulsa Drillers (Los Angeles Dodgers), and Wichita Wind Surge (Minnesota Twins).

The original Springfield Cardinals 
Springfield, Missouri, has hosted professional baseball teams since as early as 1905, when the Springfield Highlanders began play. For nearly 30 years, the team was variously called the Highlanders, Jobbers, Midgets, and Merchants. There were several years when no team existed at all.

In 1931, the St. Louis Cardinals purchased a minor league team, renamed it the Cardinals, and relocated it in Springfield. That year, the team won the first of several Western Association titles. With a front office led by future Hall of Famer Branch Rickey, Springfield also went to the playoffs in 1931, 1932, 1934, 1935, 1937, 1938, 1939, and 1941, and won league titles in 1931, 1932, 1934, 1937, and 1939.

Following the 1946 season, St. Louis moved the team to St. Joseph, Missouri, where it remained until 1953. The city of Springfield saw a brief re-emergence of minor league baseball when the rival Chicago Cubs moved its affiliate to Springfield for one season taking the name Springfield Cubs.

Though there was a gap of 63 years, most in the Springfield and St. Louis organizations consider the current Cardinals the same group which existed in 1932. Many pieces of fan apparel actually say "Springfield Cardinals circa 1932." The deck on top of the Cardinals dugout also has the championship banners from the 1930s and 1940s.

Previous franchise history
The current Cardinals are a relatively new team, dating back to just 2005. Previous to this, they were known as the El Paso Diablos. That team's owners sold the franchise to the St. Louis Cardinals and were then moved to Springfield as part of their minor league system.

The previous Double-A affiliate of the St. Louis Cardinals was the Tennessee Smokies in 2003 and 2004.

Springfield has also been the home of various other non-affiliated minor league clubs including the Springfield Highlander (1905), Jobbers (1911), Merchants (1920), Springfield Midgets (1906-1909, 1921–1929; the 1930 club being affiliated with the St. Louis Browns) and the Red Wings (1931). These former teams were generally Class C ball clubs in the former Western Association.

2012 season
The Cardinals’ most successful season has been the 2012 campaign, during which they finished first in the North Division in second half of the season, posted a division-best and franchise mark with a 77–61 record, and won the Texas League Championship. They went on to defeat the Tulsa Drillers 3–2 in the best-of-five divisional playoff series, advancing to the 2012 Texas League Championship Series, their second in franchise history. Springfield defeated the Frisco RoughRiders three games to one in the best-of-five Championship Series.  Key players included Kolten Wong, Jermaine Curtis, Carlos Martinez, Trevor Rosenthal, Vance Albitz, Oscar Taveras, and Xavier Scruggs.

Hammons Field 

The Springfield Cardinals play at Hammons Field. It is located in Springfield, Missouri, and has a capacity of 7,986 plus approximately 2,500 general admission seating.

Mascots 
The Springfield Cardinals have two mascots. Their first and main mascot is a brightly colored red bird named Louie. He has been a mascot for the team since its formation in 2005. He is the "little brother" of Fredbird, the mascot of the MLB's St. Louis Cardinals. Their second mascot is a fluffy dog named Fetch. He is a fluffy beagle received by Louie as a birthday gift on Opening Day in 2006. During home games they can be found entertaining fans by tossing t-shirts and taking photos. When the team is on the road, Louie and Fetch attend local events in the community.

Roster

Notable alumni 

Springfield played host to several players that would go on to play in Major League Baseball. Stan Musial played 87 games for Springfield during the 1941 season, batting .379 and quickly becoming a fan favorite. In April 2005, Musial threw out the ceremonial first pitch and played his harmonica to the tune of "Take Me Out to the Ball Game" to a crowd of nearly 12,000 during the inaugural St. Louis vs. Springfield Cardinals game.

Among other players to come through Springfield are Dizzy Dean and his brother Paul, Pepper Martin, and Joe Medwick.

References

External links

Springfield Cardinals official website
St. Louis Cardinals Minor Leagues at Scout.com

Texas League teams
St. Louis Cardinals minor league affiliates
Baseball teams established in 2005
Professional baseball teams in Missouri
2005 establishments in Missouri
Sports in Springfield, Missouri
Double-A Central teams